David McDuling (born 7 April 1989 in Sydney, Australia) is a rugby union footballer for the  in Super Rugby.

He was educated at Saint Ignatius' College, Riverview.

Career

Queensland Reds / Brisbane City

McDuling joined the  Academy in 2011; he was named in their squad for the 2012 Super Rugby season, but did not make any appearances due to an anterior cruciate ligament knee injury. He suffered another knee injury upon his return that also ruled him out of the entire 2013 season.

He made a further four appearances off the bench during the competition.

In the second half of 2014, McDuling also played for and captained  in the first edition of the National Rugby Championship.

He returned to the Reds lineup for the 2015 Super Rugby season. He made a total of five starts and two substitute appearances during the season.

Sharks

After the 2015 Super Rugby season, McDuling was granted an early release from his contract by the Reds and he joined the South Africa-based  on a deal until the end of 2016.

Waratahs

He returned to his hometown of Sydney to join the  prior to the 2017 Super Rugby season where he featured in every matchday squad of the season,  earning 16 caps.

Representative rugby

McDuling was part of the Australian Schoolboys team in 2007 and of the Australia under 20 team that competed in the 2009 IRB Junior World Championship.

References

External links
 Reds profile
 itsrugby.co.uk profile

1989 births
Australian rugby union players
Queensland Reds players
Brisbane City (rugby union) players
Rugby union locks
Rugby union players from Sydney
Living people
Sharks (Currie Cup) players
Sharks (rugby union) players
Canterbury rugby union players